Dor is a 2006 Indian Hindi-language drama film written and directed by Nagesh Kukunoor and features Ayesha Takia, Gul Panag and Shreyas Talpade as the lead actors. The film is an official adaptation of the Malayalam film, Perumazhakkalam (2004) and was well received by the critics after its release on 22 September 2006. Dor, which also released on a DVD, garnered rave reviews from critics and film buffs.

Dor, which was produced by Elahe Hiptoola, had cinematography by Sudeep Chatterjee and editing by Sanjib Datta. For a film that had Hindi as the predominant language with a sporadic use of Urdu, Salim–Sulaiman composed the background score.

The story is about two women who come from different backgrounds and how fate brings them together. Meera (Ayesha Takia), a young woman who becomes a widow shortly after marriage, is trapped by tradition. Zeenat (Gul Panag), on the other hand, faces the daunting task of saving the life of her husband, who is on trial for murder. A bahuroopiya (Shreyas Talpade) helps her reach Meera, who holds the "string" to Zeenat's hope. The companionship that develops between Meera and Zeenat results in redemption for both.

Plot 
Zeenat (Gul Panag) is an independent Muslim woman living in Himachal Pradesh. She marries Amir Khan, her boyfriend, who leaves for Saudi Arabia for work.

Meera (Ayesha Takia), a simple Rajasthani Hindu woman, has everything in her life in accordance with customs and traditions, including her marriage into a traditional Rajasthani family and her daily chores within the family haveli. Her husband, Shankar, is also in Saudi Arabia for work. Shankar regularly sends his wages home to support his family that includes his father, Randhir Singh (Girish Karnad), mother, grandmother, and Meera. When the remittances stop and there is no correspondence from her husband, Meera learns that Shankar was killed in a freak accident allegedly caused by his Muslim roommate, and is devastated.

The ceremonies toward rendering Meera into a widow emotionally drain her. Her vivaciousness and exuberance are stifled. The rest of the family vents their frustration of losing their only bread-winner on Meera, blaming her for bringing bad luck to the family.

Zeenat hears that her husband has been arrested for murdering his roommate in Saudi Arabia. Amir is scheduled to be executed. An Indian officer explains to her that Saudi law permits release of a criminal if the wife of the deceased forgives the guilty. Armed only with a photograph of Shankar and Amir, Zeenat sets out to find Meera. En route, she meets a Behrupiya (Shreyas Talpade), who is talented in arts and mimicry. He turns out to be a petty conman when he hoodwinks Zeenat and steals her things. However, when Zeenat falls into trouble, he returns to rescue her with his artistic talent. He is empathetic when Zeenat details her plight and offers to help. After making educated guesses, they reach Jodhpur and identify the Singh haveli. When Zeenat requests the Singh family to pardon Amir's mistake, their anger drives her away.

Feeling that befriending Meera might help her cause, Zeenat approaches her at a temple Meera visits daily. She is too afraid to tell Meera the truth and does not reveal who she is. They become good friends and spend most of their time together. Their friendship brings out the missing part in each of their personalities. Meera gets a glimpse of freedom; this brings her out of the shell of traditions and gives her a new perspective on life.

The Singh family is under debt to Chopra (Nagesh Kukunoor), a local factory owner. When Randhir requests more time to repay it, he is given an offer – pardoning the debt in exchange for Meera. Randhir accepts. When news of the death sentence arrives, Zeenat is compelled to tell the truth to Meera. The fact that her friendship was based on false pretenses hurts Meera and she refuses to sign the maafinama (statement of forgiveness). She makes it clear that she wants to hurt her husband's murderer, even if it was an accident, because of how much she is hurting in her new, veiled life.

Zeenat is hurt but accepts it as fate and decides to leave. Meera has a change of heart because of her disillusionment at Randhir's willingness to "sell" her to Chopra. She hurries to the railway station, where she gives Zeenat the signed statement of forgiveness. Zeenat extends her hand from the train and Meera grabs it and climbs aboard, running away from the only life she has ever known.

Cast 
 Ayesha Takia as Meera, the other protagonist. Coming from an orthodox Rajput family, she has to descend into a life devoid of joy.
 Shreyas Talpade as Bahuroopiya, the multi-faceted personality. He plays a supportive role to Zeenat by helping her to find Meera.
 Gul Panag as Zeenat, one of the two protagonists. A gutsy and determined wife who hopes to save her husband's life and this leads her to Meera.
 Girish Karnad as Randhir Singh, father-in-law of Meera. Quite orthodox in their customs and traditions, he turns tough on Meera after the death of the only bread-winner of their house, his son.
 Nagesh Kukunoor as Chopra, a businessman. Comes up with a proposal to forgive the debt of Randhir Singh's ancestral house at the expense of Meera.
 Prateeksha Lonkar as Gowri Singh, Randhir Singh's wife. On the pretext of tradition and customs, she exercises restraint on Meera's freedom and choices.
 Uttara Baokar as Dadima, Meera's grandmother-in-law. Her grumpy nature towards Meera transforms into empathy after Shankar, Meera's husband, is murdered. She plays a significant role in Meera's redemption from oppression.
 Aniruddha Jatkar as Shankar Singh, Meera's husband
 Rushad Rana as Amir Khan, Zeenat's husband
 Vishal Malhotra as Meera's Brother-in-law

Production

Pre-production 
The story of Dor began when Nagesh Kukunoor was attending the International Film Festival of India in November 2005. During the festival, he had hinted to a journalist that he began writing his next script. He confirmed this in another interview that after watching Perumazhakkalam (2005), whose story is based on a newspaper article, at the Film Festival, he decided to make his own version of the film. After purchasing the story rights from Kamal, director of Perumazhakkalam, he wanted to remake it in a different way. Through his story, he wanted to emphasize the protagonists' ordeal while in isolation in the form of a visual drama. However, acknowledgments to Perumazhakkalam or its makers were not provided in the credits.

Kukunoor announced the news about film making in early March 2006 and suggested of its release in August 2006. He conceptualized the film in thirds: the first and third for the lead characters and the second for the supporting one. However, Kukunoor said that all his films, at the core, have "the human element – the simplicity of the basic emotions that bind us all." Since the backdrop of the film was to be Rajasthan, he had been there and did the necessary research so as to better portray the place and characters.

Locations and casting 

Kukunoor had not visited Rajasthan or Himachal Pradesh before, but he felt that he would find great locations there. Salooni in Chamba district is considered for shooting in Himachal Pradesh. In spite of this geographical inexperience, all went as per the plans while shooting in Rajasthan. However, minor modifications in the script were allowed for the surroundings. Though Panag had been in Rajasthan, she felt the scorching summer heat unbearable at times. She liked the only continuous shooting schedule and said that it provided consistency in look and performance. In Himachal, it was slightly different when the crew had hard time framing the mountains correctly. On seeing the captured frames, they shifted all the interior shots to outside. Filming was completed in 37 days in several locations of Rajasthan. Since most of the old palaces in Rajasthan have been converted into hotels, the crew stayed at a palace resort called Manwar. They resided at a palace resort in Pokhran, while filming was done at Mehrangarh Fort in Jodhpur. Kukunoor, after completion of the shooting, said that it was his most challenging film as it involved a real-life story.

Gul Panag was impressed with Kukunoor's previous film, Rockford (1999) and her constant correspondence with him fetched her the role of Zeenat. Kukunoor felt that Panag had characteristics of someone who was lean and fit, good height, large frame, and with an appropriate skin tone. After a successful audition, she was chosen for the character that she felt was a difficult one to portray. Critiquing the actress with "I see urgency, pain but no sadness" and "I see anger and vulnerability but no guilt", the director pushed Panag to her limits. She felt that Kukunoor was such a man of conviction that he constantly forgot to eat and this once caused him a stomach infection. Gul Panag, on the other hand, said that her role was very multi-dimensional, multi-layered and hence it was quite tough to play the character. She said that Kukunoor helped her in defining her character with ease and said, "Nagesh looked at the minutest detail and was an immense support to me as an actor." However, Dor's executive producer, Elahe Hiptoola lent her voice for Panag in the film.

It was in Socha Na Tha (2004) that Kukunoor noticed Ayesha Takia and until then he assumed her to be a glamor doll. After getting convinced about her acting skills, she was roped in for the character of Meera. Takia said that though her character emotionally drained her, it was not tough to portray and that she could learn a lot about life. She further said that, "Dor was indeed an exciting challenge for the actor in me. I am happy that it was also a very exciting role, which not many actors get to portray at such a young age." She said that with Dor, she was not only in the film industry for glamor, but also for her acting prowess. While filming, Kukunoor bonded so well with Takia that he requested her to be his sister. Since she did not have a brother in real life, she got quite emotional with Kukunoor's brotherly proposal. This affection eventually solemnized in the form of a rakhi symbolically.

When Kukunoor was thinking of a character full of disguises, he first came up with an old man. When the thought of a scene with the three major characters dancing in the dunes came up, he realized that an older character could not realistically dance in the desert. He immediately felt that Shreyas Talpade, whom he knew of knowing mimicry, could be used for bahuroopiya. Kukunoor, who worked previously with Girish Karnad, said that he was the strength for the film and added that he found him a good actor and a good human being. Talpade, who previously featured as the title character in Kukunoor's Iqbal (2005), observed the bahuroopiyas in Rajasthan and incorporated their dialect, accent, and their body language for his character. About Kukunoor, he said that, "though one tends to go overboard as an actor most of the times, the way he handles the character as a director, Nagesh makes you feel that it is very simple for you to delineate the character." Through his character of a bahuroopiya, Talpade was required to perform mimicry. While he was good at mimicry in college, it was during the filming of Iqbal, Kukunoor noted this talent of his and thus Dor came into Talpade's hands. Kukunoor first wrote the screenplay in English, then had it translated to Hindi.

Release and reception 
Dor accumulated about Rs. 38 million in India at the end of 2006.

Reviews 
The Telegraph said in its review, "When you first watch Nagesh Kukunoor's impressively shot Dor, you want to simply applaud it as good cinema. Whether it's Ayesha's award-worthy performance or Shreyas' amusing moments, the credit marks pile up in favor of the director who has made engaging cinema." The Times of India said:

Dor makes a strong feminist statement without being strident or shouting slogans. And all along, the riveting friendship between the two polarized women and the events that bring them together, keep tugging at your heart. Shreyas Talpade proves that (his previous film), Iqbal was no accident and Gul Panag gives one of the most convincing portrayals of her career. But, it is Ayesha Takia who simply blows your breath away. Her journey from joyous subjugation – where she is content to dance before her husband and be at the beck and call of her in-laws – to silent emancipation is absolutely endearing.

About the technical department, The Hindu said:
 "There is this one scene when the director cuts from Zeenat (Gul Panag) trying to fix her house literally from the outside, perched on a ladder, with a hammer in hand, to Meera (Ayesha Takia) inside the house and behind a veil. The play of such visual metaphors throughout gives the film a world-class feel, the kind of stuff you usually see in Indian cinema."
Another review from The Telegraph says:
 "Sudeep Chatterjee's cinematography is excellent. He composes and constructs stylised but simple images which don't scream for attention, but unassumingly add up to create the film's striking overall visual design."

While writing about the plot and the picturization, Rediff.com concluded:
 "The script is engaging; the dialogues entertaining, witty and yet quite profound. Every scene seems to have been well etched out. The character sketches are strong and the characters are inspiring but not patronizing. The script, the story and the characters take the spotlight and the sets, though picturesque add to the plot instead of overshadowing it."
Taran Adarsh, while writing about the chances of its commercial success, said, "Dor is a well-made film that caters to those with an appetite for qualitative cinema. Awards and glowing critical acclaim, yes, it has the power to win it. But, box-office rewards and a mandate from the aam junta (common man) will elude it. The lethargic pacing will also go against it."

Reception and awards 
As per the reviews, the film could not capture much appeal at the theaters. In Kolkata, theater officials withdrew Dor  from screening one week after its theatrical release. The reason cited for this withdrawal was due to many simultaneous releases such as the films Woh Lamhe and Snakes on a Plane. However, commercial success notwithstanding for these films, Dor was brought back to the screens. Following this, Dor was screened at the annual Indo-American Arts Council Film Festival and the Atlanta Indo-American Film Festival.

Along with nominations for cinematography, dialogues, lyrics and supporting actor (for Shreyas Talpade), the film won the critics award for Ayesha Takia and Gul Panag at the 2007 Zee Cine Awards. At the annual Star Screen Awards, Talpade and Takia won the best actor in a comic role and critics choice for best actress awards respectively along with other nominations. At Stardust Awards ceremony, Takia and Panag won awards for their performances. Takia further won the Best Actress Award at the Bengal Film Journalists' Association Awards. Karthik Saragur and Komal Sahani were nominated for Best Costume Design at 52nd Filmfare Awards.

Home media

DVD 
The DVD version of the film was released on 20 October 2006.
The DVD release, which was distributed by Eros Entertainment, is available in 16:9 Anamorphic widescreen, Dolby Digital 5.1 Surround, progressive 24 FPS, widescreen and NTSC format. With a runtime of 147 minutes, the DVD has a provision for English subtitles. However, some versions of the film jacket list the runtime as 63 minutes.

Soundtrack 

The soundtrack, which was composed by Salim–Sulaiman and the lyrics by Mir Ali Hussain, was released on 26 August 2006 with a typical and traditional Rajasthani flavor.

One review about the soundtrack said that, "this is no ordinary album and will be preferred by musical elites. Infused with classical music and Rajasthani folk music, it is a good quality album coming out of Salim-Sulaiman. But the shortcoming comes in the form that this is not the kind of music that'll please every ear." Another review, in a similar tone, said that the album "works only for those who are either followers of classical music or enjoy hearing songs with a Rajasthani folk music base. There is no doubt that composers good quality throughout, but overall the album caters only to a niche audience." About the background score, Kukunoor said that "to put soaring music to give it a larger-than-life film image was pretty difficult". Despite this worry, with Salim–Sulaiman composing the music, he was happy with the way it was composed according to the sequence. Shreya Ghoshal, Karsan Sagathia, Sunidhi Chauhan and a Pakistani singer, Shafqat Amanat Ali were among those who sang the songs. While releasing the soundtrack, Kukunoor said that Salim–Sulaiman and he tried make songs that "stood out from the clutter and something that was different from the item numbers or the boring love ballads."

See also 

 Perumazhakkalam

References

External links 
 
 Variety review

2006 films
2006 drama films
2000s Hindi-language films
Hindi remakes of Malayalam films
Indian drama films
Films set in Rajasthan
Films about women in India
Films about widowhood in India
Films shot in Rajasthan
Films directed by Nagesh Kukunoor